Johnson Island is a bar in the Greenbrier River at its confluence with Muddy Creek in Alderson, West Virginia, United States. The island lies in Greenbrier County, with the Alderson Federal Prison Camp located to its southwest across the county line in Summers County.

See also
List of islands of West Virginia

References

River islands of West Virginia
Landforms of Greenbrier County, West Virginia